This is a list of avant-garde and experimental films released between 1960 and 1964. Unless where noted, all films had sound and were in black and white.

References

1960s
Avant-garde